United States gubernatorial elections were held in 1895, in nine states.

Kentucky, Maryland and Mississippi held their gubernatorial elections in odd numbered years, every 4 years, preceding the United States presidential election year. New Jersey at this time held gubernatorial elections every 3 years, which it would abandon in 1949. Massachusetts and Rhode Island both elected its governors to a single-year term, which they would abandon in 1920 and 1912, respectively. Iowa and Ohio at this time held gubernatorial elections in every odd numbered year.

Utah held its first gubernatorial election on achieving statehood.

Results

References

Notes

Bibliography 
 
 
 
 
 

 
November 1895 events